"My Head Is a Jungle" is a remixed version of Australian singer-songwriter Emma Louise's solo single "Jungle", credited to German producer Wankelmut and Emma Louise. It was released in 2 January 2013 through German label Poesie Musik, a sublabel of Get Physical Music. "My Head Is a Jungle" charted across Europe, having the most success in Italy and the United Kingdom, where it reached number 5. 

A remix by MK not released on the original press received airplay in mid-2014, and is more popular by YouTube views than the original.

In January 2022, the song went viral on TikTok as part of the "My Head Is A Jungle" trend, almost 11 years since the release of the original version and 9 years since the Wankelmut remix was released.

Track listings
Digital download / 12" vinyl (Part 1)
 "My Head Is a Jungle" (Original Mix) – 7:45
 "My Head Is a Jungle" (Kasper Bjorke's Liquid Lips Remix) – 6:15
 "My Head Is a Jungle" (Solee Remix) – 8:21

Digital download / 12" vinyl (Part 2)
 "My Head Is a Jungle" (Extended Vocal Mix) – 6:33
 "My Head Is a Jungle" (Gui Boratto Remix) – 7:00
 "My Head Is a Jungle" (Gui Boratto Dub Mix) – 7:32

Digital download (Part 3)
 "My Head Is a Jungle" (MK Remix) – 8:37
 "My Head Is a Jungle" (MK Trouble Dub) – 8:44

Italian enhanced CD maxi
 "My Head Is a Jungle" (Extended Vocal Mix) – 6:33
 "My Head Is a Jungle" (Original Mix) – 7:45
 "My Head Is a Jungle" (Gui Boratto Remix) – 7:00
 "My Head Is a Jungle" (Gui Boratto Dub Mix) – 7:32
 "My Head Is a Jungle" (Solee Remix) – 8:21
 "My Head Is a Jungle" (Kasper Bjorke's Liquid Lips Remix) – 6:15
 "My Head Is a Jungle" (Gui Boratto Remix – Short Edit) – 3:29
 "My Head Is a Jungle" (Radio Edit) – 3:33
 includes "My Head Is a Jungle" video (3:33)

Digital download (MK Remix)
 "My Head Is a Jungle" (MK Remix – Radio Edit) – 3:27
 "My Head Is a Jungle" (Area10 MK Remix – Radio Edit) – 4:30
 "My Head Is a Jungle" (MK Remix) – 8:39
 "My Head Is a Jungle" (Area10 MK Remix) – 8:23
 "My Head Is a Jungle" (My Head Is a Dub MK Remix) – 7:38
 "My Head Is a Jungle" (MK Trouble Dub) – 8:45

Digital download (The UK Remixes)
 "My Head Is a Jungle" (Billon Remix) – 5:44
 "My Head Is a Jungle" (Friend Within Remix) – 7:02
 "My Head Is a Jungle" (Friend Within Dub) – 7:00

Charts

Weekly charts
"My Head Is a Jungle"

MK remix

Year-end charts

Certifications

References

2011 songs
2013 singles
Emma Louise songs
Songs written by Marc Kinchen